The 1993–94 Buffalo Sabres season was the Sabres' 24th season in the National Hockey League.

Offseason

NHL Draft
Buffalo's draft picks at the 1993 NHL Entry Draft held at the Quebec Coliseum in Quebec City, Quebec.

Regular season
In the course of the regular season, the Sabres allowed the fewest goals (218) and tied the New York Rangers for most power-play goals with 96. They also tied the Boston Bruins and the Tampa Bay Lightning for the fewest power-play goals allowed (58), had the most shutouts (9) and the best penalty-kill percentage (84.74%)

Season standings

Schedule and results

Player statistics

Forwards
Note: GP = Games played; G = Goals; A = Assists; Pts = Points; PIM = Penalty minutes

Defencemen
Note: GP = Games played; G = Goals; A = Assists; Pts = Points; PIM = Penalty minutes

Goaltending
Note: GP = Games played; W = Wins; L = Losses; T = Ties; SO = Shutouts; GAA = Goals against average

Playoffs
1994 Stanley Cup playoffs
On April 27, 1994, the Sabres played the New Jersey Devils in a classic playoff game when the Sabres outlasted the Devils 1-0 in a quadruple-overtime affair that required 70 saves from Hasek. Martin Brodeur, the Devils goalie went toe to toe with Dominik Hašek. Dave Hannan scored the lone, winning goal.

(3) New Jersey Devils vs. (6) Buffalo Sabres

Awards and records
 Dominik Hašek, Nominee, Hart Memorial Trophy
 Dominik Hašek, William M. Jennings Trophy
 Dominik Hašek, Vezina Trophy
 Dominik Hašek, NHL First Team All-Star

References
 Sabres on Hockey Database

Buffalo Sabres seasons
B
B
Buffalo
Buffalo